The Power of 7 – Elevating Elevators is the sixth studio album by The Dogg. It was officially released on 30 April 2010 in Windhoek. The album features artists such as Betholdt, Nasti, OmPuff, K.K., and Biblos among others.

The first single, "Take You Home Tonight" was released in December 2009 and has received massive airplay and entered charts on most radio stations. The second single, "The New Michael Jackson" was released in January 2010.

The album contains three bonus music videos.

Track listing
 All songs written and produced by The Dogg

2010 albums
The Dogg albums
Albums produced by the Dogg
Mshasho Productions albums